KWFO-FM (102.1 FM) is a radio station broadcasting a country music format, simulcasting KWFI-FM 96.1 Idaho Falls, ID. Licensed to Driggs, Idaho, United States, the station is currently owned by Rich Broadcasting Idaho LS, LLC.

History
On October 25, 2018, the then-KCHQ rebranded from "River Country" to "The Wolf". The station changed its call sign to KWFO-FM on November 26, 2018.

Translators and booster

References

External links

WFO-FM
Country radio stations in the United States
Radio stations established in 2003
2003 establishments in Idaho